Center Moriches is a hamlet and census-designated place in Suffolk County, New York, United States. The population was 7,580 at the 2010 census. Center Moriches is in the town of Brookhaven. It is the location of the historic Masury Estate Ballroom and Terry-Ketcham Inn, both listed on the National Register of Historic Places.

The name Moriches comes from Meritces, a Native American who owned land on Moriches Neck.

Geography

Demographics

Demographics for the CDP
As of the census of 2000, there were 6,655 people, 2,319 households, and 1,776 families residing in the CDP. The population density was 1,327.2 per square mile (512.9/km2). There were 2,465 housing units at an average density of 491.6/sq mi (190.0/km2). The racial makeup of the CDP was 90.02% White, 5.24% African American, 0.17% Native American, 0.99% Asian, 1.29% from other races, and 2.28% from two or more races. Hispanic or Latino of any race were 6.61% of the population.

There were 2,319 households, out of which 36.2% had children under the age of 18 living with them, 62.7% were married couples living together, 9.4% had a female householder with no husband present, and 23.4% were non-families. 17.4% of all households were made up of individuals, and 6.8% had someone living alone who was 65 years of age or older. The average household size was 2.83 and the average family size was 3.20.

In the CDP, the population was spread out, with 25.1% under the age of 18, 7.0% from 18 to 24, 32.9% from 25 to 44, 22.8% from 45 to 64, and 12.1% who were 65 years of age or older. The median age was 37 years. For every 100 females, there were 97.3 males. For every 100 females age 18 and over, there were 95.1 males.

For 2016, the median income for a household in the CDP was $95,932. The per capita income for the CDP was $38,431.  About 4.5% of families and 6.5% of the population were below the poverty threshold, including 7.6% of those under age 18 and 9.7% of those age 65 or over.

Schools 
The hamlet has three schools: Clayton Huey Elementary School, Center Moriches Middle School, and Center Moriches High School. The middle school and high school are part of the same building.

Media
Radio station WJVC at 96.1 FM is licensed to serve Center Moriches.

Notable people

Marvin Bell - First poet laureate of Iowa
Jeff LeBlanc - American singer-songwriter
Anthony Leone - American mixed martial artist
Linda Lovelace - Actor, author
Ferdinand Marcos – Filipino politician, lawyer, and kleptocrat
Imelda Marcos – Filipina politician and convicted criminal
Chester G. Osborne - American composer, music educator, writer, and trumpeter
Daniel Pelosi - American murderer of Ted Ammon
Caroline Rose - American singer, songwriter, and musician
Sue Wicks - Former WNBA player and WNBA Hall Of Famer.
Paul Gibson Jr. - Former Major League Baseball player.

References

External links
 
Shark Mouth Seafood Store Entrance: Atlantic Seafood Fish Market; Center Moriches, New York (RoadsideAmerica)

Brookhaven, New York
Hamlets in New York (state)
Census-designated places in New York (state)
Census-designated places in Suffolk County, New York
Hamlets in Suffolk County, New York
Populated coastal places in New York (state)